The Bleriot-SPAD S.28 was a long-range record-breaking aircraft developed by SPAD in the late 1910s. It was a biplane with a monocoque fuselage, and was made of wood and canvas.

Specifications

See also

References

1910s French aircraft
SPAD aircraft
Biplanes
Single-engined tractor aircraft
Aircraft first flown in 1919